Northeast Cape Fear River is a  long 5th order tributary to the Cape Fear River in southeastern North Carolina.

Variant names
According to the Geographic Names Information System, it has also been known historically as:  
 North East River
 Northeast Fork

Course
On its course it flows past Albertson, Hallsville, and Chinquapin. In Pender County near the Atlantic coast, it passes along the west side of Angola Swamp and Holly Shelter Swamp. It joins the Cape Fear River on the north end of Wilmington, forming an estuary that emerges at Cape Fear. The lower 50 mi (80 km) of the river is tidal.

Watershed
Northeast Cape Fear River drains  of area, receives about 53.8 in/year of precipitation, and has a wetness index of 593.72 and is about 19% forested.

Animals and plants
The river and its valley are home to a variety of interesting and uncommon flora and fauna, including the palmetto, cypress, alligator, pileated woodpecker, venus flytrap, and bowfin.

Bridges
 Isabelle S. Holmes Bridge (US 74/NC 133)
 Dan Cameron Bridge (I-140)
 Frank H. Kenan Bridge (I-40)
 Northeast Cape Fear Bridge (US 117/NC 133)

See also
 Goshen Swamp
 List of North Carolina rivers

References

External links
 USGS Water Gauge near Chinquapin, North Carolina
 USGS Water Gauge near Burgaw, North Carolina

Rivers of North Carolina
Rivers of Wayne County, North Carolina
Rivers of Lenoir County, North Carolina
Rivers of Pender County, North Carolina
Rivers of New Hanover County, North Carolina
Tributaries of the Cape Fear River